Just Between You and Me is the first collaborative studio album by Porter Wagoner and Dolly Parton. It was released on January 15, 1968, by RCA Victor. The album was produced by Bob Ferguson. It peaked at number eight on the Billboard Top Country Albums chart and spawned one single, "The Last Thing on My Mind", which peaked at number seven on the Billboard Hot Country Songs chart.

Background
When Norma Jean announced that she was leaving The Porter Wagoner Show in August 1967, Wagoner asked Parton to replace her as the "girl singer" on his television series and road show. Parton made her first TV appearance on September 5 and the duo made their first concert appearance on September 14, in Lebanon, Virginia. The crowd greeted Parton with boos and chants for Norma Jean, which led Wagoner to begin singing duets with Parton on the show. Monument Records released Parton's debut album on September 18. In addition to having her join his show as a regular, Wagoner was instrumental in persuading RCA Victor to sign Parton to a recording contract. The duo had their first recording session on October 10 at RCA Studio B in Nashville. Parton's first three sessions for RCA were limited to duets with Wagoner as she could not record for RCA as a solo artist until her contract with Monument expired. Wagoner and Parton made their first Grand Ole Opry appearance together on November 25.

Recording
Recording sessions for the album took place at RCA Studio B in Nashville, Tennessee, on October 10, 11 and 12, 1967.

Release and promotion
The album was released January 15, 1968, on LP.

Singles
The album's only single, "The Last Thing on My Mind", was released in October 1967 and debuted at number 70 on the Billboard Hot Country Songs chart dated December 2. It peaked at number seven on the chart dated February 10, 1968, its eleventh week. It charted for 17 weeks. The single also peaked at number four on the RPM Country Singles chart in Canada.

Critical reception

Billboard gave a positive review of the album, calling it "enjoyable." The review praised the duo's singing as "exceptional" and the arrangements as "groovy." AllMusic gave the album 3 out of 5 stars.

Commercial performance
The album debuted at number 32 on the Billboard Top Country Albums chart dated February 3, 1968. It peaked at number eight on the chart dated March 9, its sixth week on the chart. The album charted for a total of 27 weeks.

Reissues
The album was reissued on CD in 1995 as 2Gether on 1 with Parton's album Just Because I'm a Woman. It was released as a digital download on March 3, 2017. The album was included in the 2014 box set Just Between You and Me: The Complete Recordings, 1967–1976. BGO Records reissued the album on CD in 2020 on a two-CD set with Always, Always, Porter Wayne and Dolly Rebecca, and Love and Music.

Track listing

Personnel
Adapted from the album liner notes and RCA recording session records.

Jerry Carrigan – drums
Anita Carter – background vocals
Pete Drake – pedal steel
Dolores Edgin – background vocals
Bob Ferguson – producer
Roy M. Huskey, Jr. – bass
Mack Magaha – fiddle
Jim Malloy – recording engineer
George McCormick – rhythm guitar
Wayne Moss – electric guitar
Dolly Parton – lead vocals
Hargus Robbins – piano
Buck Trent – banjo
Bill Turner – liner notes
Porter Wagoner – lead vocals

Charts

Release history

References

Dolly Parton albums
Porter Wagoner albums
1968 debut albums
Vocal duet albums
Albums produced by Bob Ferguson (music)
RCA Records albums